Douglas Camilo da Silva, known as Douglas Camilo born in the Barretos, is a midfielder who plays in the Inter de Bebedouro.

Career
Plays in the Inter de Bebedouro.

Career statistics
(Correct )

Contract
 Inter de Bebedouro.

See also
Football in Brazil
List of football clubs in Brazil

References

External links
 ogol
 soccerway

1990 births
Living people
Brazilian footballers
Footballers from São Paulo (state)
Association football midfielders
Grêmio Barueri Futebol players
Associação Atlética Internacional (Bebedouro) players
People from Barretos